Peter Stewart McKennan (16 July 1918 – 28 September 1991) was a Scottish professional footballer who played as an inside forward in the Scottish and English leagues, most notably for Partick Thistle, for whom he scored 113 goals in 198 appearances in all competitions. McKennan represented the Scottish and Irish League representative teams and is a member of the Partick Thistle Hall of Fame. He was nicknamed "Ma Ba" ("my ball"), due to his desire to receive the ball into feet and dictate play.

Club career 
An inside forward, McKennan began his senior career with Scottish League First Division club Partick Thistle in 1934 and though his career was interrupted by Second World War, he remained with the club through the war. He made nearly 200 appearances for the club in all competitions, scoring 113 goals and was posthumously inducted into the club's Hall of Fame. McKennan moved south of the border to join Second Division club West Bromwich Albion (for whom he had guested during the war) for a £10,650 fee in October 1947.

McKennan went on to play for Football League clubs Leicester City, Brentford, Middlesbrough and Oldham Athletic and scored 63 goals in 171 appearances, before moving to Northern Ireland in 1954, where he played out two injury-ravaged seasons as player-manager of Coleraine. As of December 2018, McKennan is the third of three Brentford players to register five goals in a single league match.

International career 
After making appearances for the Scottish and Irish League representative teams, McKennan scored on his solitary appearance for Scotland in a 3–2 win over an Irish XI on 28 April 1940.

Personal life 
McKennan served in the British Army during the Second World War and saw action as a Command Sergeant-Major on D-Day.

Honours

As a player 
Oldham Athletic
 Football League Third Division North: 1952–53

As a manager 
Coleraine
 North West Senior Cup: 1954–55, 1955–56

As an individual 
 Partick Thistle Hall of Fame

Career statistics

References

External links
 
Peter McKennan at ptfc.co.uk

1918 births
1991 deaths
Scottish footballers
Partick Thistle F.C. players
West Bromwich Albion F.C. players
Leicester City F.C. players
Brentford F.C. players
Middlesbrough F.C. players
Oldham Athletic A.F.C. players
English Football League players
Scottish Football League players
Scottish Football League representative players
Association football inside forwards
Association football player-managers
Footballers from Airdrie, North Lanarkshire
Whitburn Junior F.C. players
Brentford F.C. wartime guest players
Chelsea F.C. wartime guest players
Raith Rovers F.C. players
West Bromwich Albion F.C. wartime guest players
Coleraine F.C. players
Coleraine F.C. managers
NIFL Premiership managers
Scottish Junior Football Association players
Scottish football managers
Scotland wartime international footballers
British Army personnel of World War II
Linfield F.C. wartime guest players
Glentoran F.C. wartime guest players
British Army soldiers